Players and pairs who neither have high enough rankings nor receive wild cards may participate in a qualifying tournament held one week before the annual Wimbledon Tennis Championships.

Seeds

  Kelly Jones /  Kenny Thorne (first round)
  Joshua Eagle /  Lars Rehmann (qualified)
  Nicklas Utgren /  Lars-Anders Wahlgren (second round)
  Neil Broad /  Matt Lucena (first round)
  Grant Doyle /  Paul Kilderry (qualified)
  Tom Kempers /  Michael Tebbutt (qualifying competition, lucky losers)

Qualifiers

  Grant Doyle /  Paul Kilderry
  Joshua Eagle /  Lars Rehmann
  Stephen Noteboom /  Fernon Wibier

Lucky losers

  Wayne Arthurs /  Brent Larkham
  Tom Kempers /  Michael Tebbutt

Qualifying draw

First qualifier

Second qualifier

Third qualifier

External links

1994 Wimbledon Championships – Men's draws and results at the International Tennis Federation

Men's Doubles Qualifying
Wimbledon Championship by year – Men's doubles qualifying